Another South is a 2014 Italian romance-drama film written and directed by Gianluca Maria Tavarelli and starring Isabella Ragonese. It was the first film in Italy to be simultaneously released  through the streaming services and in theaters.

Plot

Cast  
 
Isabella Ragonese as Stefania
Francesco Scianna as Roberto 
Mehdi Dehbi as Khaleed
Stefania Orsola Garello    
Nello Mascia
  
 Yessmine Ouni
 Salima Al Wadi

See also
 List of Italian films of 2014

References

External links

Italian romantic drama films
2014 romantic drama films
2010s Italian-language films
2010s Italian films